Muna Lee may refer to:

Muna Lee (writer) (1895–1965), American poet and first wife of Luis Muñoz Marín, Puerto Rico's first elected governor 
Muna Lee (athlete) (born 1981), American athlete